Pagellus acarne is a species of fish belonging to the family Sparidae.

It is native to Southern Europe and Northern Africa.

References

acarne